Barice is a village in Serbia. It is situated in the Plandište municipality, in the South Banat District, Vojvodina province. The village has a Romanian ethnic majority (89,13%) and its population numbering 598 people (2002 census).

Historical population

1961: 1,331
1971: 1,259
1981: 1,044
1991: 887
2002: 598

References
Slobodan Ćurčić, Broj stanovnika Vojvodine, Novi Sad, 1996.

See also
List of places in Serbia
List of cities, towns and villages in Vojvodina

Populated places in South Banat District
Populated places in Serbian Banat
Plandište
Romanian communities in Serbia